Tumut High School is a government-funded co-educational comprehensive secondary day school, located in Tumut, in the Riverina region of New South Wales, Australia.  

Established in 1913 the school enrolled approximately 540 students in 2018, from Year 7 to Year 12, of whom ten percent identified as Indigenous Australians and four percent were from a language background other than English. The school is operated by the NSW Department of Education; the principal is Donald Dixon.

See also 

 List of government schools in New South Wales
 List of schools in the Riverina
 Education in Australia

References

External links 
 
 NSW Schools website

Public high schools in New South Wales
Educational institutions established in 1800
1913 establishments in Australia
Tumut
Education in the Riverina